"Say 'I Gotta Believe!'" is a single by De La Soul featuring Japanese singer Double. The song was released as part of the soundtrack for the popular Japanese videogame, PaRappa the Rapper 2. Outside Japan, copies of the single are extremely rare. The song received a promotional video, which featured the group as chefs, mixed with clips of PaRappa. The song can also be heard in the record shop of PaRappa The Rapper 2 and in the opening menu if the player waits through the beginning rap, though the singles' opening was cut in the menu version, making the CD from the record shop and the vinyl disc the only way to fully hear the song.

Tracklisting
"Say "I Gotta Believe!"" - 4:34

2002 singles
De La Soul songs
2001 songs
Tommy Boy Records singles
Songs written by David Jude Jolicoeur
Songs written by Vincent Mason
Songs written by Kelvin Mercer